Leptodeira uribei, Uribe's cat-eyed snake or Uribe's false cat-eyed snake, is a species of snake in the family Colubridae.  The species is native to Mexico.

References

Leptodeira
Snakes of North America
Reptiles of Mexico
Endemic fauna of Mexico
Reptiles described in 1992
Taxa named by Hobart Muir Smith